Marsalis Music Honors Series: Jimmy Cobb is a jazz album by drummer Jimmy Cobb. Marsalis Music and Rounder Records jointly released the album in 2006 as part of the Marsalis Music Honors series. The album's musicians include Ellis Marsalis Jr. on piano.

Track listing 
 "Mr. Lucky" (Henry Mancini) - 6:32
 "W.K." (Jimmy Cobb, David Matthews) - 7:12
 "Eleanor (Sister Cobb)" (Jimmy Cobb) - 6:11
 "Composition 101" (Jimmy Cobb) - 6:46
 "Can You Read My Mind" (John Williams) - 7:31
 "There is Something About You (I Don't Know)" (Andrew "Tex" Allen") - 5:56
 "Johnny One Note" (Richard Rodgers, Lorenz Hart) - 6:05
 "Real Time" (Richard Tee) - 4:16
 "Tell Me" (Ellis Marsalis) - 5:16
 "Tune 341" (Jimmy Cobb, David Matthews) - 6:12

Personnel 
 Jimmy Cobb – drums
 Ellis Marsalis – piano
 Andrew Speight – saxophone
 Orlando Le Fleming – bass

References 

Jimmy Cobb albums
2006 albums
Rounder Records albums
Marsalis Music albums